Blues Pills are a Swedish rock band, formed in Örebro in 2011. The band has released three studio albums, two EPs, three live albums and five singles since its formation. Their latest studio album, Holy Moly!, was released in August 2020 through Nuclear Blast.

History

Formation and EPs (2011–2013)
In 2011, step-brothers Zack Anderson (bass) and Cory Berry (drums), formerly of Radio Moscow, were in Iowa and met singer Elin Larsson, who was staying in California. Together they recorded two demo tracks and published them on YouTube, after which label "Crusher Records" offered them a deal. The band toured to Spain and France, where they met 16-year-old guitarist Dorian Sorriaux, whom they invited to Örebro and made a member of the band. The name of the band came from their friend, Jens Heide, who had a music blog called BluesPillz with obscure 60s and 70s underground music.

In May 2012 they released an EP called "Bliss", followed by the "Black Smoke" single in July. The band toured extensively during 2013 with appearances in Berlin's "Desertfest" in April, in Bad Kötzting's "Void Fest" and Geel's "Yellowstock Festival" in August, in Bonn's "Crossroads Festival" in October and Melbourne's "Cherry Rock Festival" in November 2013.

In July 2013, Blues Pills signed a contract with the "Nuclear Blast" label and released their "Devil Man" EP in October . Their appearance at the "Crossroads Festival" was recorded and released in the form of the "Live at Rockpalast" EP in March 2014.

The self-titled debut album and Lady in Gold (2014–2017)

In July 2014 they released their first album, Blues Pills, the special edition of which included a DVD of their appearance in the "Hammer of Doom" festival from the year before. Shortly after the release of the first album, Cory Berry was replaced with new drummer André Kvarnström.

In mid-2014 they appeared in the "Sweden Rock Festival", in Gelsenkirchen's "Rock Hard Festival" in June and in the famous Montreux Jazz Festival in July 2014.

The album became successful in Europe, climbing to No. 4 in Germany and No. 10 in Switzerland, while it also reached British charts at No. 68.

During the end of 2015 and the start of 2016, the band started writing and recording their second album. On 22 April 2016, Blues Pills announced that Lady in Gold would be released on 5 August 2016 through Nuclear Blast with a ten track set-list.

In 2016, Blues Pills toured with Kadavar, play festivals in the summer in North America and Europe followed by a UK tour in November.

A live album Lady in Gold Live in Paris was announced with a release date of 3 November 2017.

Departure of Dorian Sorriaux and Holy Moly! (2018–present)
In November 2018 the band announced the peaceful departure of guitarist Dorian Sorriaux via a post on their Facebook page. Work on a third album will continue, with Zack Anderson moving to guitar. In October 2019, it was announced that Kristoffer Schander would be joining on the bass guitar, in the same post, they have also announced that they were working on their third studio album, set to be released in 2020.

On 6 March 2020, the band released the first single of their third album, "Proud Woman", in the same video, they announced their upcoming third studio album is titled Holy Moly!. On 10 April 2020, they released their second single from the upcoming album titled "Low Road" which was accompanied by an official music video. On 10 July 2020, they released the third and final single titled "Kiss By Past Goodbye". Holy Moly! was originally meant to be released on 19 June 2020 but was postponed to 21 August 2020 due to the COVID-19 pandemic.

Band members
Current members
Elin Larsson – vocals (2011–present)
Zack Anderson – bass (2011–2019), guitar (2019–present)
André Kvarnström – drums (2014–present)
Kristoffer Schander – bass (2019–present)

Former members
Cory Berry – drums (2011–2014)
Dorian Sorriaux – guitars (2011–2018)

Tour- and session member
Rickard Nygren - guitars, organ (2016–present)

Discography
Albums

References

BLUES PILLS on Rock Overdose: "It's all about the feeling and soul in the music for us"

External links

 
 BLUES PILLS – Nuclear Blast
 Blues Pills | Music Biography, Credits and Discography | Allmusic
 Blues Pills – YouTube

Swedish rock music groups
Musical groups established in 2011
Musical quartets
2011 establishments in Sweden
Female-fronted musical groups